Gola  is a village in the administrative district of Gmina Gorzów Śląski, within Olesno County, Opole Voivodeship, in south-western Poland.

The village has a population of 260.

References

Gola